Solesmes may refer to the following places in France:

 Solesmes, Nord, a commune in the Nord department
 Solesmes, Sarthe, a commune in the Sarthe department
 Solesmes Abbey, also known as St. Peter's Abbey, in the Sarthe department
 Solesmes Congregation, an association of monasteries within the Benedictine Confederation